SARM Division No. 3 is a division of the Saskatchewan Association of Rural Municipalities (SARM) within the province of Saskatchewan, Canada.  It is located in the south west area of the province. There are 45 rural municipalities in this division. The current director for Division 3 is Larry Grant.

List of Rural Municipalities in SARM Division No. 3

by numerical RM #

 RM No. 17 Val Marie
 RM No. 18 Lone Tree
 RM No. 19 Frontier
 RM No. 45 Mankota
 RM No. 46 Glen McPherson
 RM No. 49 White Valley
 RM No. 51 Reno
 RM No. 75 Pinto Creek
 RM No. 76 Auvergne
 RM No. 77 Wise Creek
 RM No. 78 Grassy Creek
 RM No. 79 Arlington
 RM No. 105 Glen Bain
 RM No. 106 Whiska Creek
 RM No. 107 Lac Pelletier
 RM No. 108 Bone Creek
 RM No. 109 Carmichael
 RM No. 110 Piapot
 RM No. 111 Maple Creek
 RM No. 135 Lawtonia
 RM No. 136 Coulee
 RM No. 137 Swift Current
 RM No. 138 Webb
 RM No. 139 Gull Lake
 RM No. 141 Big Stick
 RM No. 142 Enterprise
 RM No. 165 Morse
 RM No. 166 Excelsior
 RM No. 167 Saskatchewan Landing
 RM No. 168 Riverside
 RM No. 169 Pittville
 RM No. 171 Fox Valley
 RM No. 225 Canaan
 RM No. 226 Victory
 RM No. 228 Lacadena
 RM No. 229 Miry Creek
 RM No. 231 Happyland
 RM No. 230 Clinworth
 RM No. 232 Deer Forks
 RM No. 255 Coteau
 RM No. 256 King George
 RM No. 257 Monet
 RM No. 259 Snipe Lake
 RM No. 260 Newcombe

Footnotes

External links
SARM Division No. 3 members

SARM divisions of Saskatchewan